Raphael Neale (died October 19, 1833) was an American politician.  Born in St. Mary's County, Maryland, Neale resided in Leonardtown and received a limited education.  He was elected as a Federalist to the Sixteenth and Seventeenth Congresses, and reelected as an Adams-Clay Federalist to the Eighteenth Congress, serving from March 4, 1819, to March 3, 1825.  He died in Leonardtown.

References

18th-century births
1833 deaths
People from Leonardtown, Maryland
Year of birth unknown
Federalist Party members of the United States House of Representatives from Maryland